Mrunalinni Patil is an Indian director and producer of Hindi and Marathi cinema. She is most known for her films Kagaar: Life on the Edge(2003), Manthan: Ek Amrut Pyala (2006), Raakhandaar (2014) and Kaay Raav Tumhi(2015)

Career

Patil is a graduate of medical school. She has been working for the welfare of society since age twenty. She made feature length and short films to reform society and considered socioeconomic problems through the medium of cinema. Her first film was Kagaar: Life on the Edge in 2003. The story was about the life of police personnel and was critically acclaimed and popular. She made a short film Adopt a Girl Child that was screened by Zee TV. She directed and produced a Marathi film called Manthan Ek Amrut Pyala that was screened by Art of Living at Nav Chetana Shivir across Maharashtra.

Filmography

Marathi films

Hindi films

Television

See also
 Shivam Patil

References

External links
 

Living people
Marathi film directors
Marathi film producers
Film directors from Mumbai
Film producers from Mumbai
Indian television producers
Year of birth missing (living people)